The Greeks Gate ( or ;) is a gate into the fortified city of Mdina, Malta. The gate was originally built in the medieval period, and its outer portal was built in the Baroque style in 1724 by Charles François de Mondion. Despite this, the rear part of its gate retains its original form, making it one of the few visible remains of Mdina's medieval walls.

History
The Greeks Gate is one of two main gates of Mdina, the other being the Mdina Gate. It is located near the southwest corner of the city, and it got its name since a small Greek community once lived close to the gate. This gate was the only entrance into Mdina from which slaves were allowed to enter.

In the medieval period, the Greeks Gate was flanked by a D-shaped wall tower, which remained in use until the early 18th century, when Mdina's fortifications were upgraded under the military engineer and architect Charles François de Mondion. It is believed that the tower still exists buried behind Mondion's ramparts. At this point, Mondion also grafted a Baroque portal onto the Greeks Gate, giving it its present appearance. The inscription on the gate which commemorates this renovation is dated 1724.

The Greeks Gate was restored between January and June 2003 by the Restoration Unit of the Ministry for Resources and Infrastructure. Restoration cost Lm15,000, and it included cleaning the gate, consolidating its decorative elements, and removal of vegetation on the roof. Plans for another restoration were made in 2014, when the government allocated €1 million of ERDF funds for the restoration of Greeks Gate and the surrounding areas. Restoration of the gate commenced in late 2015 and was completed in early 2016.

The Greeks Gate was included on the Antiquities List of 1925. Today, it is scheduled as a Grade 1 national monument, and it is also listed on the National Inventory of the Cultural Property of the Maltese Islands.

Architecture

The Greeks Gate actually consists of two vaulted gateways grafted in front of each other. The inner gate still retains its original medieval features, including a pointed arch. A guardhouse was located inside the passageway between the gates. The outer gate consists of a Baroque portal, decorated with various coats of arms and a Latin inscription reading:

The upper part of Greeks Gate contains a mural and oil paintings, one representing the Virgin and Child with Saint Anne and the Trinity, and the other showing the Baptism of Saint Publius by Paul the Apostle accompanied by Luke the Evangelist.

The gate is approached through a pas-de-souris which is sometimes referred to as the Outer Greeks Gate. This was originally protected by a re-entrant place-of-arms, and was linked to the gate by a caponier. Today, the pas-de-souris provides vehicular access into the Mdina ditch, while the place-of-arms and caponier no longer exist. The gate was protected by a wooden à la Vauban drawbridge and a drop ditch, but the latter has been filled in. The underground chamber in which the drawbridge was retracted still exists. The gate still retains its wooden door in situ.

See also
Mdina Gate

References

External links

3D reconstruction of Greeks Gate in its medieval form
3D reconstruction of Greeks Gate in its present form

Mdina
Gates in Malta
City gates
Buildings and structures completed in 1724
Baroque architecture in Malta
Limestone buildings in Malta
National Inventory of the Cultural Property of the Maltese Islands
1724 establishments in Malta